The Welfare Committee is a standing committee of the Icelandic parliament.

Jurisdiction 

According to law № 55/1991, with later amendments, all matters relating to the following subjects are referred to the Welfare Committee:

 Health insurance
 Social security
 Social services
 Children
 Senior citizens
 Disability
 Housing
 Labour market
 Health care

Members, 140th parliament 

The main members have seats in the committees and attend the meetings. When they are unable to do so the substitute members temporarily take their place.

Main

Substitute

See also 

 List of standing committees of the Icelandic parliament

External links 

  
  

Standing committees of the Icelandic parliament